The Waorani (Huaorani) language, commonly known as Sabela (also Wao, Huao, Auishiri, Aushiri, Ssabela ; autonym: Wao Terero; pejorative: Auka, Auca) is a vulnerable language isolate spoken by the Huaorani people, an indigenous group living in the Amazon rainforest  between the Napo and Curaray Rivers in Ecuador. A small number of speakers with so-called uncontacted groups may live in Peru.

Huaorani is considered endangered due to growing bilingualism in Quechua and Spanish and diminishing Huaorani usage among youth.

Dialects
Huaorani has three dialects: Tiguacuna (Tiwakuna), Tuei (Tiwi Tuei, Tiwi), and Shiripuno.

Language relations
Sabela is not known to be related to any other language. However, it forms part of Terrence Kaufman's Yawan proposal.

Jolkesky (2016) also notes that there are lexical similarities with Yaruro.

Phonology
Huaorani distinguishes nasal vowels from oral ones. Syllable structure is (C)V, with frequent vowel clusters.

Vocabulary
Loukotka (1968) lists the following basic vocabulary items for Sabela and Tiwituey.

{| class="wikitable sortable"
! gloss !! Sabela !! Tiwituey
|-
! one
|  || 
|-
! two
|  || 
|-
! head
|  || 
|-
! eye
|  || 
|-
! woman
|  || 
|-
! fire
|  || 
|-
! sun
|  || 
|-
! star
|  || 
|-
! maize
|  || 
|-
! house
|  || 
|-
! white
|  || 
|}

References

Bibliography
 Campbell, Lyle. (1997). American Indian Languages: The Historical Linguistics of Native America. New York: Oxford University Press. .
 Greenberg, Joseph H. (1987). Language in the Americas. Stanford: Stanford University Press.
 Kaufman, Terrence. (1990). Language History in South America: What We Know and How to Know More. In D. L. Payne (Ed.), Amazonian Linguistics: Studies in Lowland South American languages (pp. 13–67). Austin: University of Texas Press. .
 Kaufman, Terrence. (1994). The Native Languages of South America. In C. Mosley & R. E. Asher (Eds.), Atlas of the World's Languages (pp. 46–76). London: Routledge.
 Peeke, M. Catherine. (2003). A Bibliography of the Waorani of Ecuador. SIL International. Retrieved 2021 April 4 from https://www.sil.org/resources/archives/7801
Pike, Evelyn G and Rachel Saint. 1988. Workpapers Concerning Waorani discourse features. Dallas, TX: SIL.
 Rival, Laura. Trekking through History: The Huaorani of Amazonian Ecuador, Columbia University Press, 2002.

External links
Lengua Sabela
Huaorani - The First To Spanish Dictionary
Waorani language dictionary online from IDS (select simple or advanced browsing)
Waorani (Intercontinental Dictionary Series)

Language isolates of South America
Languages of Ecuador
Indigenous languages of the South American Northern Foothills
Endangered indigenous languages of the Americas
Endangered language isolates
Huaorani